Bradyrhizobium icense is a bacterium from the genus of Bradyrhizobium.

References

Durán, D; Rey, L; Mayo, J; Zúñiga-Dávila, D; Imperial, J; Ruiz-Argüeso, T; Martínez-Romero, E; Ormeño-Orrillo, E (2014). "Bradyrhizobium paxllaeri sp. nov. And Bradyrhizobium icense sp. nov., nitrogen-fixing rhizobial symbionts of Lima bean (Phaseolus lunatus L.) in Peru". International Journal of Systematic and Evolutionary Microbiology. 64 (Pt 6): 2072–8. doi:10.1099/ijs.0.060426-0. .

Nitrobacteraceae
Bacteria described in 2014